Abul Khair was a Rohingya police officer in British Burma who was later elected to the parliament of the Union of Burma.

Early life
Khair was born in Maungdaw, Akyab District in the Arakan Division of Burma (now Rakhine State, Myanmar). He served in the Imperial Police Force (once part of the Indian Imperial Police) in Arakan Division, with postings in Buthidaung, Kyaukpyu and Sandoway.

Political career
Khair was elected president of the township council of Maungdaw in 1955. He was nominated by the Anti-Fascist People's Freedom League, the founding political party of Burma. During the 1956 Burmese general election, he was elected from Maungdaw South to the Union Parliament. He received the highest vote share among Rohingya candidates. Khair worked to establish schools and exam centers across Arakan Division.

Khair was involved in deliberations regarding Arakan's statehood.

See also
Rohingya people

References

Rohingya politicians
Burmese Muslims
People from Maungdaw